The United Kingdom Census 1891 was a census of the United Kingdom of Great Britain and Ireland carried out on Sunday 5 April 1891. A question was added to record the number of rooms in a household, in response to concerns about overcrowding in cities. This was also the first census to employ women census takers and the first to ask in Wales about the ability to speak Welsh.

The total population of England, Wales and Scotland was recorded as 33,015,701.

See also
Census in the United Kingdom
List of United Kingdom censuses

References

1891
Census
April 1891 events